Blast or The Blast may refer to:

Explosion, a rapid increase in volume and release of energy in an extreme manner
Detonation, an exothermic front accelerating through a medium that eventually drives a shock front

Film
 Blast (1997 film), starring Andrew Divoff
 Blast (2000 film), starring Liesel Matthews
 Blast (2004 film), an action comedy film
 Blast! (1972 film) or The Final Comedown, an American drama
 BLAST! (2008 film), a documentary about the BLAST telescope
 A Blast, a 2014 film directed by Syllas Tzoumerkas

Magazines
 Blast (magazine), a 1914–15 literary magazine of the Vorticist movement
 Blast (U.S. magazine), a 1933–34 American short-story magazine
 The Blast (magazine), a 1916–17 American anarchist periodical

Music
 Blast (American band), a hardcore punk band
 Blast (Russian band), an indie band
 Blast, a Danish band with which Hanne Boel performed
 Blast (album), by Holly Johnson, 1989
 The Blast (album), by Yuvan Shankar Raja, 1999
 "The Blast" (song), by Reflection Eternal, 2001
 "Blast", a song by Momoiro Clover Z, 2017

Science and technology
 BLAST (protocol), file transfer software
 BLAST (telescope), Balloon-borne Large Aperture Submillimeter Telescope
 BLAST (biotechnology), Basic Local Alignment Search Tool, an algorithm used in bioinformatics
 Blast cell or precursor cell, in cytology, a type of partially differentiated, usually unipotent cell
 Blast disease, a disease of cereal crops
 Blast injury, a complex type of physical trauma resulting from direct or indirect exposure to an explosion
 BLAST network, a proposed rapid transit system for Hamilton, Ontario, Canada
 Bell Laboratories Layered Space-Time, a transceiver architecture
 FreeX Blast, a German paraglider design

Other
 Blast! (comics), a 1991 British comic
 Blast! (musical), a 2001 Broadway musical
 Blast! Entertainment, a defunct video game developer and publisher
 C. L. Blast (1934–2016), recording name of Clarence Lewis
 Bus Line Service of Turlock (BLAST), the former name for the public bus service operated by Turlock Transit in Turlock, California, US

See also
 Blaster (disambiguation)
 Blasting (disambiguation)
 Blast Off (disambiguation)